The 2800 class are a class of diesel locomotive built by A Goninan & Co, Townsville for Queensland Rail between 1995 and 1998.

They are currently owned by Aurizon, with the exception of one owned by Watco Australia, and operate on the North Coast and Mount Isa lines.

History
The 2800 class were ordered to haul passenger and freight services on the North Coast line between Rockhampton and Cairns and on the Great Northern line between Townsville and Mount Isa. The initial order for 40 was later increased to 50. However, a miscommunication resulted in the builder's plates incorrectly being stamped as 202 to 211 which had been used by other A Goninan & Co locomotives, rather than the correct 323 to 332.

They now operate trains as far south as Brisbane. They are the only double ended diesel electric locomotives to have been built for Queensland Rail.

In February 2006, one locomotive was fitted with standard gauge bogies for use by QR National in New South Wales and Victoria, but the NSW Environment Protection Authority refused permission for it to be used in that state due to excessive noise emissions. In August 2009, it was converted back to narrow gauge for use in Western Australia. In 2013, three were reclassified as the 3200 class for use in NSW, following the installation of standard gauge bogies and a modified exhaust system that reduced low frequency noise emissions.

In 2015, 2814 derailed on the Mount Isa Line at Julia Creek, spilling sulphuric acid. 2814 flipped on its side and was deemed too damaged to repair, and as such was scrapped in 2017.

In the early hours of Wednesday 23 February 2022, 2811 along with 2338 derailed hauling a container train near Traveston after severe rain washed out the tracks. Both locomotives were turned onto their sides. 2811 is currently at UGL Rail's facility in Stuart, Queensland.

Status Table

References

Aurizon diesel locomotives
Co-Co locomotives
Diesel locomotives of Queensland
Queensland Rail locomotives
Railway locomotives introduced in 1995
Diesel-electric locomotives of Australia
General Electric locomotives
3 ft 6 in gauge locomotives of Australia
Standard gauge locomotives of Australia